El Morabba3 ( meaning "The Square") is an Arabic rock band from Amman, Jordan, formed in 2009.

Biography
The Jordan-based group was formed in 2009 as an Arab rock band. In July 2012 they released their debut album, titled El Morabba3 (The Square), afterwards they gained huge popularity across the region. In 2015 they launched a crowdfunding campaign for their newest album, Taraf Al Khait.
The band's fan base throughout the Arab world and internationally has been steadily growing. In 2014, they appeared in front of thousands of fans as part of a major musical competition called SoundClash in Amman against another Jordanian band called  Autostrad.

Current members
Muhammad Abdullah - Co-founder, singer songwriter and bassist
Basel Naouri - Producer, synth & trumpet player

Former members
El Far3i - acoustic guitar and vocals
Odai Shawagfeh - Co-founder, production, electric guitar, keyboards & synth
Dirar Shawagfeh - Co-founder, drums, percussion

Festivals/tours

Soundclash Jordan (2014)
El rab3 (2014)
Al Balad Music Festival (2015)
London Sound (2015)
Alexandria (2015)
Bala Feesh (2015)
Jerash Roman Theater (2015)
Amman New York Fusion (2016)
Oshtoora Festival (2016)
Music Park Festival (2017)
Visa for Music (2017)

Discography

Albums
El Morabba3 (album) (The Square) (2012): 
El Morabba3 - Asheek
El Morabba3 - Ma Indak Khabar
El Morabba3 & El Far3i - Taht il Ard
El Morabba3 - Tarweej
El Morabba3 & El Far3i - Ya Zein
El Morabba3 - Cigara Qabel Ma Nqoom
El Morabba3 & El Far3i - Laykoon
El Morabba3 - Aghanneek
El Morabba3 & El Far3i - Hada Tani
Taraf Al Khait (2016):
El Morabba3 - Intro
El Morabba3 - Ilham
El Morabba3 - Abaad Shwaii 1
El Morabba3 - El Bath El Haii
El Morabba3 - Shiber Maii
El Morabba3 - Biddeesh Aaraf Ana Min Wein
El Morabba3 - El Mokhtalifeen
El Morabba3 - 100000 Malion Meel
El Morabba3 - Abaad Shwaii 2
El Morabba3 - El Raai

See also
 Music of Jordan
 Arabic music

References

External links
 

Jordanian rock music groups
Indie rock groups